Three Stripes in the Sun is a 1955 American war film directed by Richard Murphy and starring Aldo Ray, Philip Carey and Dick York.

It is a story of an American sergeant stationed in Japan after World War II who falls for a local girl.

Plot
Sgt. Hugh O'Reilly and his friend, Cpl. "Nebby" Muhllendorf, are assigned to peacetime Osaka, Japan after the end of World War II. Still upset over his experiences at Pearl Harbor, O'Reilly unsuccessfully asks his colonel for a transfer.

O'Reilly's prejudices continue to surface, particularly when his wallet is missing and presumed stolen. After he finds a Japanese man with it, O'Reilly intends to seek retribution until he learns that the man runs an orphanage and was simply returning a wallet that he found.

O'Reilly and Nebby visit the orphanage and, moved by its impoverished conditions, donate money and food. O'Reilly also develops a romantic interest in a local girl, Yuko, but believes a future together would be difficult. He decides to break off contact with Yuko after the outbreak of conflict in Korea, but when he and Nebby are wounded and return to Japan, he and Yuko decide to try a life together in the United States.

Cast
 Aldo Ray as MSgt. Hugh O'Reilly
 Philip Carey as Col. William Shepherd (as Phil Carey)
 Dick York as Cpl. Nebby Muhlendorf
 Chuck Connors as Idaho Johnson
 Camille Janclaire as Sister Genevieve 
 Hehachirô Ôkawa as Father Yoshida (as Heihachirô 'Henry' Ôkawa) 
 Tatsuo Saitô as Konoya
 Tamao Nakamura as Satsumi
 Mitsuko Kimura as Yuko

References

External links

O'Reilly's Orphanage' (Review of this film) at The New York Times

1955 films
1950s war drama films
Columbia Pictures films
Films scored by George Duning
Films set in Osaka
American war drama films
Pacific War films
Japan in non-Japanese culture
1950s English-language films
1950s American films
American black-and-white films